Florence/Salt Lake is a planned light rail station in the Los Angeles County Metro Rail system. It is located at the intersection of Florence Avenue and Salt Lake Avenue in Huntington Park, California and is part of the West Santa Ana Branch Transit Corridor project. Measure M funds are programmed for a scheduled completion in 2041, though the station may be constructed for an opening between 2033 and 2035.

References

Railway stations in Los Angeles County, California
Huntington Park, California
Future Los Angeles Metro Rail stations
Railway stations scheduled to open in 2033